Michael Joe Whitehead (born June 29, 1981) is a former professional mixed martial artist. He competed in the Light Heavyweight and Heavyweight weight classes for the Ultimate Fighting Championship, IFL, Affliction, and Strikeforce.

Mixed martial arts career
At Crater High School, Mike was a state champion wrestler in the 189lb division in 1999 and played defensive lineman in football.

Mike Whitehead started wrestling at North Idaho College, Southern Oregon University, and the University of Missouri. He is a 3 time All American Wrestler and Abu Dhabi qualifier. In 2005, he participated in the reality series The Ultimate Fighter 2 on Spike TV.

Prior to his fight with Renato Sobral, he was on a 13 fight win streak, including five straight victories in the IFL. He has proven himself dangerous standing and striking, as well as with wrestling and submission grappling.

He has also competed in the standup only fight organization Xtreme Fighting Association where he defeated Ethen Cox by unanimous decision.

Personal life
Whitehead was arrested by Las Vegas Metro Police on April 14, 2010, after a female acquaintance filed a report that he had sexually assaulted her at his home.  He faces several charges including two counts of sexual assault and one count each of attempted sexual assault and open and gross lewdness. Additional charges could still be coming for Mike based on the marijuana grow operation detectives found when they went to serve a warrant in response to the sexual assault. Detectives found 50 marijuana plants inside the residence, all of which were confiscated and destroyed after they were granted a warrant for the plants.

Whitehead reached an agreement with Clark County prosecutors to make a no-contest plea. On September 12, 2011, he pleaded no-contest to the charges and faced up to 20 years in prison. On January 19, 2012, Whitehead was sentenced to one to four years in prison.

Championships and accomplishments
Icon Sport
SuperBrawl 24: Return of the Heavyweights Tournament Runner Up
International Fighting Championship
IFC Heavyweight Championship (One time)

Mixed martial arts record

|-
| Loss
| align=center| 27–8
| Brian Heden
| Decision (unanimous)
| Dakota FC / Ultimate Productions: Winter Brawl
| 
| align=center| 3
| align=center| 5:00
| Fargo, North Dakota, United States
| 
|-
| Win
| align=center| 27–7
| Jojo Thompson
| Submission (neck crank)
| RITC: Rage in the Cage 156
| 
| align=center| 1
| align=center| 1:58
| Chandler, Arizona, United States
| 
|-
| Win
| align=center| 26–7
| Eddie Sanchez
| Decision (split)
| PFC: Pure Fighting Championships 6
| 
| align=center| 3
| align=center| 5:00
| Red Deer, Alberta, Canada
| 
|-
| Win
| align=center| 25–7
| Chase Gormley
| TKO (punches)
| IFC: Extreme Challenge
| 
| align=center| 4
| align=center| 2:22
| Mt. Pleasant, Michigan, United States
| 
|-
| Loss
| align=center| 24–7
| Muhammed Lawal
| KO (punches)
| Strikeforce: Evolution
| 
| align=center| 1
| align=center| 3:08
| San Jose, California, United States
| 
|-
| Win
| align=center| 24–6
| Kevin Randleman
| Decision (unanimous)
| Strikeforce: Lawler vs. Shields
| 
| align=center| 3
| align=center| 5:00
| St. Louis, Missouri, United States
| 
|-
| Win
| align=center| 23–6
| Leo Pla
| Submission (guillotine choke)
| M-1 Challenge 8: USA
| 
| align=center| 1
| align=center| 1:20
| Kansas City, Missouri, United States
| 
|-
| Loss
| align=center| 22–6
| Renato Sobral
| Decision (unanimous)
| Affliction: Banned
|                                   
| align=center| 3
| align=center| 5:00
| Anaheim, California, United States
| 
|-
| Win
| align=center| 22–5
| Zak Jensen	
| Submission (armbar)
| Beatdown: 4 Bears Casino                   
|                                   
| align=center| 1
| align=center| 2:06
| North Dakota, United States
| 
|-
| Win
| align=center| 21–5
| Soakai Pulu
| Submission (keylock)
| Throwdown Showdown 1: Showdown
| 
| align=center| 1
| align=center| 0:59 
| Orem, Utah, United States
| 
|-
| Win
| align=center| 20–5
| Daniel Sarafian
| Decision (unanimous)
| PFP: Ring Of Fire
| 
| align=center| 3
| align=center| 5:00
| Manila, Philippines
| 
|-
| Win
| align=center| 19–5
| Vernon White	
| TKO (punches)
| IFL: Las Vegas
| 
| align=center| 2
| align=center| 0:54
| Las Vegas, Nevada, United States
| 
|-
| Win
| align=center| 18–5
| Wojtek Kaszowski
| TKO (punches)
| IFL: Connecticut
| 
| align=center| 1
| align=center| 2:43
| Uncasville, Connecticut, United States
| 
|-
| Win
| align=center| 17–5
| Krzysztof Soszynski
| Decision (unanimous)
| IFL: World Championship Final
| 
| align=center| 3
| align=center| 4:00
| Uncasville, Connecticut, United States
| 
|-
| Win
| align=center| 16–5
| Mark Kerr
| TKO (punches)
| IFL: World Championship Semifinals
| 
| align=center| 1
| align=center| 2:40
| Portland, Oregon, United States
| 
|-
| Win
| align=center| 15–5
| Michael Buchkovich
| TKO (submission to punches)
| CFC2: Combat Fighting Championship
| 
| align=center| 1
| align=center| 4:04
| Orlando, Florida, United States
| 
|-
| Win
| align=center| 14–5
| Ruben Villareal
| Submission (keylock)
| Valor Fighting: Showdown At Cache Creek II
| 
| align=center| 1
| align=center| 1:02
| Brooks, California, United States
| 
|-
| Win
| align=center| 13–5
| Rich Beecroft
| Submission (keylock)
| RITC 85: Xtreme Cage Fighting
| 
| align=center| 1
| align=center| 1:17
| Phoenix, Arizona, United States
| 
|-
| Win
| align=center| 12–5
| Rocky Batastini
| Submission (kimura)
| RITC 83: Rampage
| 
| align=center| 1
| align=center| 0:14
| Arizona, United States
| 
|-
| Win
| align=center| 11–5
| Mike Bourke
| TKO (retirement) 
| UAGF: Kaos on the Kampus
| 
| align=center| 3
| align=center| N/A
| Los Angeles, California, United States
| 
|-
| Win
| align=center| 10–5
| Robert Beraun
| Submission (kimura)
| RITC 80: Fight Night at The Fort
| 
| align=center| 1
| align=center| 2:57
| Fountain Hills, Arizona, United States
| 
|-
| Loss
| align=center| 9–5
| Keith Jardine
| Decision (unanimous)
| UFC 57
| 
| align=center| 3
| align=center| 5:00
| Las Vegas, Nevada, United States
| 
|-
| Win
| align=center| 9–4
| Travis Fulton
| Submission (bulldog choke)
| EC 61: Extreme Challenge 61
| 
| align=center| 1
| align=center| 1:30
| Osceola, Iowa, United States
| 
|-
| Win
| align=center| 8–4
| Aaron Brink
| Decision (unanimous)
| UAGF: Clover Combat
| 
| align=center| 3
| align=center| 5:00
| California, United States
| 
|-
| Win
| align=center| 7–4
| Matt Bear
| TKO (submission to strikes)
| VFC 9: Madness
| 
| align=center| 2
| align=center| 0:54
| Council Bluffs, Iowa, United States
| 
|-
| Loss
| align=center| 6–4
| Brandon Vera
| TKO (doctor stoppage)
| WEC 13: Heavyweight Explosion
| 
| align=center| 2
| align=center| 1:12
| Lemoore, California, United States
| 
|-
| Win
| align=center| 6–3
| Terrell Dees
| Submission (neck crank)
| WEC 13: Heavyweight Explosion
| 
| align=center| 1
| align=center| 3:43
| Lemoore, California, United States
| 
|-
| Win
| align=center| 5–3
| Demian Decorah
| TKO (punches)
| EC 59: Extreme Challenge 59
| 
| align=center| 1
| align=center| 3:25
| Medina, Minnesota, United States
| 
|-
| Win
| align=center| 4–3
| Brian Stromberg
| Submission
| SF 5: Stadium
| 
| align=center| 2
| align=center| N/A
| Gresham, Oregon, United States
| 
|-
| Win
| align=center| 3–3
| Karl Knothe
| Submission (neck crank)
| EC 58: Extreme Challenge 58
| 
| align=center| 1
| align=center| 1:17
| Medina, Minnesota, United States
| 
|-
| Loss
| align=center| 2–3
| Alex Paz
| Decision (split)
| HOOKnSHOOT: Absolute Fighting Championships 2
| 
| align=center| 2
| align=center| 5:00
| Fort Lauderdale, Florida, United States
| 
|-
| Loss
| align=center| 2–2
| Tim Sylvia
| TKO (knee and punches)
| SB 24: Return of the Heavyweights 2
| 
| align=center| 1
| align=center| 2:38
| Honolulu, Hawaii, United States
| SuperBrawl Return of the Heavyweights Finals.
|-
| Win
| align=center| 2–1
| Ben Rothwell
| Decision (unanimous)
| SB 24: Return of the Heavyweights 2
| 
| align=center| 2
| align=center| 5:00
| Honolulu, Hawaii, United States
| SuperBrawl Return of the Heavyweights Semifinals.
|-
| Loss
| align=center| 1–1
| Tim Sylvia
| TKO (punches)
| SB 24: Return of the Heavyweights 1
| 
| align=center| 1
| align=center| 3:46
| Honolulu, Hawaii, United States
| SuperBrawl Return of the Heavyweights Quarterfinals.
|-
| Win
| align=center| 1–0
| Kim Bower
| TKO (punches)
| GVT: Gladiators Vale Tudo
| 
| align=center| 1
| align=center| N/A
| Worley, Idaho, United States
|

Kickboxing record 

|-
|-  bgcolor="#CCFFCC"
| 2008-03-22 || Win ||align=left| Ethen Cox || XFA 1|| Las Vegas, Nevada, USA || Decision (unanimous) || 3 || 3:00 || 1-0
|-
|-
| colspan=9 | Legend:

References

External links

 

1981 births
Living people
Sportspeople from Medford, Oregon
American male mixed martial artists
Light heavyweight mixed martial artists
Mixed martial artists utilizing collegiate wrestling
American male kickboxers
Heavyweight kickboxers
Heavyweight mixed martial artists
Southern Oregon University alumni
Ultimate Fighting Championship male fighters
American male sport wrestlers
Amateur wrestlers